Middelburg Commando was a light infantry regiment of the South African Army. It formed part of the South African Army Infantry Formation as well as the South African Territorial Reserve.

History

Origin
The Middelburg Commando can probably trace its origins to the Middelburg Vrywilligers(Volunteers) of 1876.

Operations

With the Republic of Transvaal

Boer Bagananwa War
During the period of 1894-95, the Middleburg commando was involved in the siege of Leboho as a result of the government introducing a hut tax on people living in their suzerainty. Kgosi Maleboho and the Bahananwa refused to pay taxes and three commandos were sent to subdue them, besieging their mountain fortress.

Anglo Boer War
During the Anglo Boer War, the Middelburg Commando was engaged against the British at the Battle of Thukela Heights on 13 to 28 February 1900 and the Battle of Bergendal on 21 August 1900.

With the Union Defence Force
Closed down by the British following the Anglo Boer War, it then existed as a Rifle Association in the early 1920s until the formal establishment as a Rifle Commando around 1949.

With the SADF
During this era, the unit was mainly used for area force protection, search and cordones as well as stock theft control assistance to the rural police. The unit was part of the Danie Theron Group of the NT Command. It was then placed under the command of Group 12 HQ at Ermelo.

With the SANDF

Disbandment
This unit, along with all other Commando units was disbanded after a decision by South African President Thabo Mbeki to disband all Commando Units. The Commando system was phased out between 2003 and 2008 "because of the role it played in the apartheid era", according to the Minister of Safety and Security Charles Nqakula.

Unit insignia

Leadership 
 Kommandant W.J. Steyn 1899-1902
 Kommandant Piet Trichaardt 1900 at the Battle of Thukela Heights

See also
 South African Commando System

References

Infantry regiments of South Africa
South African Commando Units